Celebrity is an upcoming South Korean streaming television series written by Kim Yi-young and directed by Kim Cheol-kyu. Park Gyu-young, Kang Min-hyuk, Lee Chung-ah, Lee Dong-gun and Jun Hyo-seong round out the ensemble cast. It is scheduled to be released on Netflix in 2023.

Synopsis 
Celebrity depicts the desires and mysteries surrounding people who become SNS stars, living as so-called celebrities and the people who envy them.

Cast

Main 

 Park Gyu-young as Seo Ah-ri
 Kang Min-hyuk as Han Jun-kyung
 Lee Chung-ah as Yoon Shi-hyeon
 Lee Dong-gun as Jin Tae-jeon
 Jun Hyo-seong as Oh Min-hye

Special appearance 

 Lee Jun-ho

Production

Casting 
In May 2022, Celebrity confirmed production with ensemble casting of Park Gyu-young, Kang Min-hyuk, Lee Chung-ah, Lee Dong-gun and Jun Hyo-seong.

Filming 
Filming began in December 2021.

References

External links 
 
 
 

Korean-language Netflix original programming
Television series by Studio Dragon
Television series by Kim Jong-hak Production
South Korean drama web series
Upcoming Netflix original programming
Upcoming television series
2023 South Korean television series debuts
2023 web series debuts
Television series about social media